The 2021 Teréga Open Pau–Pyrénées was a professional tennis tournament played on indoor hard courts. It was the third edition of the tournament which was part of the 2021 ATP Challenger Tour. It took place in Pau, France between 15 and 21 November 2021.

Singles main-draw entrants

Seeds

 1 Rankings are as of 8 November 2021.

Other entrants
The following players received wildcards into the singles main draw:
  Dan Added
  Gabriel Debru
  Harold Mayot

The following player received entry into the singles main draw as a special exempt:
  Hiroki Moriya

The following players received entry into the singles main draw as alternates:
  Geoffrey Blancaneaux
  Julien Cagnina
  Pavel Kotov

The following players received entry from the qualifying draw:
  Sebastian Fanselow
  Michael Geerts
  Calvin Hemery
  Georgii Kravchenko

Champions

Singles

 Radu Albot def.  Jiří Lehečka 6–2, 7–6(7–5).

Doubles

 Romain Arneodo /  Tristan-Samuel Weissborn def.  Aisam-ul-Haq Qureshi /  David Vega Hernández 6–4, 6–2.

References

Teréga Open Pau-Pyrénées
2021 in French tennis
November 2021 sports events in France